Alameda High School is a co-educational state high school serving grades 9–12.  It is located in Alameda, California, United States, and is part of the Alameda Unified School District.

History 
The suggestion to open a "Preparatory Department of a High School" was first presented at an Alameda Board of Education meeting held on March 6, 1874. On April 17, 1874, C. Y. Johns was elected as the first principal. Classes began with 52 students, in July 1874, in a rented room over a drugstore on Park Street known as "Boehmer's Hall". The building still exists today as the China House restaurant.

Boehmer's Hall was only temporary. A new building was already being built on a site on Santa Clara at Chestnut, and was completed and occupied in 1875. The high school shared space with the Grammar Department in what became known as Haight School. The site is still occupied by this school today. The class of 1878, totalling nine students, was the first to graduate from Alameda High School.

It wasn't long before the number of students enrolled in the high school outgrew the space available at Haight. Temporary quarters were located at the Porter school, located on Alameda Avenue, by 1900. A campaign was started for a new separate high school building.

With the help of the high school student body, a bond was passed in the city for the new school. The cornerstone was laid in 1902 on the new site at Central and Walnut. The building was dedicated in 1903 and occupied in time for the December 1903 term.

Continued growth in enrollment required an even larger campus. In 1925 a new bond issue was voted on. The new school, dedicated in 1926, comprised three connected buildings, including the original 1903 structure which was refurbished to blend with the architectural style of the other two. The architecture, designed by local architect Carl Werner, is early twentieth-century Neo-Classical Revival in nature, evoking images of ancient Greek temples with Ionic columns in front of the Kofman Auditorium, a facility known throughout the Bay Area as one of the best of the local playhouses.

By 1955, the "old building" had outlived its usefulness and was replaced with what became known as the "new building" by subsequent students until 1977.

Campaigns to replace old public buildings with newer earthquake-safe structures led to the construction of the newest high school building, across the street from the established campus, on Encinal at Walnut.

Original plans involved tearing down the 1926 buildings and replacing them with a sports complex, and only keeping the "new building" of 1955. A dedicated group of alumni and citizens saved the venerable buildings, and the planned new construction was scaled back to what exists today.

The newest building was first occupied in 1978 and included the site of the former Porter school. The west wing now houses Language and Fine Arts, as well as the Frederick L. Chacon Little Theater.  The school was made an Alameda Historical Monument in 1976 and was listed in the National Register of Historic Places in 1977.

Enrollment and academics 
Alameda High School is an ethnically diverse school and has a composition that is 41% Asian, 30% White, 13% Hispanic, 6% Black, and 4% two or more races.

The school has received National Blue Ribbon recognition and California Distinguished School and Digital High School awards.  It is accredited by the Western Association of Schools and Colleges, offering more than a dozen Advanced Placement courses.

Alameda High School has a good academic performance in general, and Alameda High School is ranked #109 in California. In 2017, 95% of the students graduated.

Other student activities

Athletics 

AHS is part of the West Alameda County Conference (WACC) of the North Coast Section (NCS) of the California Interscholastic Federation (CIF).

Encinal High, Alameda High, and St. Joseph Notre Dame High School collectively field men's and women's rugby union teams.

Other varsity sports include:

Notable alumni 

 Dick Bartell, professional baseball player (New York Giants, Pittsburgh Pirates, Philadelphia Phillies, Chicago Cubs, Detroit Tigers)
 Andy Carey, professional baseball player, 2-time World Series champion (New York Yankees, Kansas City Athletics, Chicago White Sox, Los Angeles Dodgers)
 Danny Chauncey, guitarist for .38 Special
Keelan Doss, professional football player for the Atlanta Falcons
 Debbi Fields, creator of Mrs. Fields bakery
 Ray French, Professional baseball player (New York Yankees, Brooklyn Robins, Chicago White Sox)
 Mary Gennoy, medical marijuana activist in San Francisco
 William F. Knowland, 1925 Senior class president and United States Senator
 Kreayshawn (attended 2004–2006, did not graduate), rapper, best known for her hit single "Gucci Gucci"
 Duffy Lewis, Professional baseball player (Boston Red Sox, New York Yankees, Washington Senators)
 Dutch Lieber, Professional baseball player (Philadelphia Athletics)
 Bill Macdonald, Professional baseball player (Pittsburgh Pirates)
 Jim Morrison (attended starting 1958, did not graduate), songwriter, lead singer for The Doors
 Lou Nova, boxer 
 Simon Rex (class of 1992), actor
 Mikhaila Rutherford (class of 2006), paralympic swimmer
 Erik Schullstrom, Professional baseball player (Minnesota Twins)
 Bill Serena, Professional baseball player (Chicago Cubs)
 Chris Speier, Professional baseball player (San Francisco Giants, Montreal Expos, St. Louis Cardinals, Minnesota Twins, Chicago Cubs)
 Stephen Stucker actor
 Taylor Takahashi, actor and chef
 Leo Thomas, Professional baseball player (St. Louis Browns, Chicago White Sox)
 Johnny Vergez, Professional baseball player (New York Giants, Philadelphia Phillies, St. Louis Cardinals)
 Bob Veselic, Professional baseball player (Minnesota Twins)

Notable faculty 
 Don Perata, politician (former faculty)

References

External links 
 Alameda High School

Educational institutions established in 1874
Buildings and structures in Alameda, California
High schools in Alameda County, California
School buildings on the National Register of Historic Places in California
National Register of Historic Places in Alameda County, California
Neoclassical architecture in California
School buildings completed in 1928
Public high schools in California
1874 establishments in California